South Plymouth is a hamlet in Chenango County, New York, United States. South Plymouth has a post office with ZIP code 13844, which opened on April 20, 1848.

References

Hamlets in Chenango County, New York
Hamlets in New York (state)